The Lex Plautia Papiria de Civitate Sociis Danda was a Roman plebiscite enacted amidst the Social War in 89 BCE. It was proposed by the  Tribunes of the Plebs, M. Plautius Silvanus and C. Papirius Carbo. The law granted Roman citizenship  to Italian communities that had previously rebelled against Rome during this war.

Background 
The Social War, which was fought between 91 and 88 BCE, was a rebellion against Rome by some of her Italic socii (allies) caused by Rome's refusal to grant them Roman citizenship. However, this concession became necessary to try to stem the rebellion. The Lex Plautia Papiria was not the first law that extended Roman citizenship during the Social War. In 90 BCE, the Lex Calpurnia gave commanders the power to reward valor of soldiers with Roman citizenship. In the same year, the  Lex Julia de Civitate Latinis et Socii Danda granted civitas to Italian communities who had not participated in the rebellion against Rome to prevent them from joining the war. The law stated that communities with newly granted citizenship should be enrolled in new tribes for voting in the Comitia Tributa. In 89 BCE the Lex Plautia Papiria followed the guidelines laid out in the Lex Julia for adding new tribes to the Comitia Tibuta for the new communities which were also granted citizenship. In the same year, the Lex Pompeia de Transpadanis granted Latin rights to the communities in  Transpadana, the region north of the River Po as a reward for having sided with Rome during the war.

Provisions 
While the complete original text of the law has never been recovered, Cicero stated several of the provisions of the law in his Pro Archia Poeta Oratio:

Thus, an individual had to meet three conditions to become a Roman citizen under the newly created law: he must claim citizenship in an Italian city that was a Roman ally, he must have already established residence there before the passing of this law and he must then present himself to a praetor within sixty days to be considered for citizenship. Unlike the Lex Julia, which granted citizenship only to entire cities, the Lex Papiria Plautia could be used to grant citizenship to individuals as well.

Effects 
Demonstrating its use in granting citizenship to an individual, the law was used as justification for bestowing citizenship upon Aulus Licinius Archias. Archias, a Greek poet, was accused of assuming his citizenship illegally. However, in Pro Archia, Cicero used, among other reasons, the Lex Plautia Papiria to uphold the legitimacy of Archias’ citizenship.

The law, however, was ineffective at persuading confederate towns and at ending the war. By placing the newly admitted citizens into new tribes instead of assimilating them into previously established tribes, the laws made the votes of the new citizens virtually worthless. Thus, Italian confederates had little incentive to stop fighting against Rome. Although it is also worth noting the significant benefits brought aside from suffrage (protection from mistreatment during military service, improved legal rights, and for the rich, chances to bid for lucrative tax farming contracts) which may for many have been most significant.

See also 
Lex Julia
Roman law
List of Roman laws

Notes

References 
Cerutti, Steven M. (1998). Cicero Pro Archia Poeta Oratio. Wauconda, Ill: Bolchazy-Caarducci Publishers, 1988. 
 Dart, C. J., The Social War, 91 to 88 BCE: A History of the Italian Insurgency against the Roman Republic, Routledge, 2014; 
Cicero, M. Tullius. (1856). The Orations of Marcus Tullius Cicero, literally translated by C. D. Yonge. London: Henry G. Bohn, York Street, Covent Garden. OCLC: 4709897
Gotoff, Harold C. (1979). Cicero’s Elegant Style: An Analysis of the Pro Archia. Chicago: University of Illinois Press. 
Keaveney, Arthur. (1987). Rome and the Unification of Italy. Beckenham: Croom Helm Ltd. 
(1996). The Oxford Classical Dictionary, 3rd Edition: “Gaius Papirius Carbo”. New York: Oxford University Press.

External links
The Roman Law Library, incl. Leges

Roman law
89 BC
1st century BC in law